United Nations Associations are recognized in 92 United Nations member-States according to World Federation of United Nations Associations.

Here are all/most of the countries that have agreed to the UNA:

Africa
Benin
Botswana
Burkina Faso
Burundi
Côte d'Ivoire
Democratic Republic of Congo
Egypt
Ethiopia
Ghana
Kenya
Liberia
Mauritius
Morocco
Nigeria
Rwanda
Somalia
South Africa
Sudan
Tanzania
Togo
Tunisia
Uganda
Zimbabwe

Asia

Bangladesh
Bhután
China
India
Iran
Japan
Kyrgyz Republic
Lebanon
Malaysia
Mongolia
Nepal
Pakistan
Philippines
Republic of Korea
Singapore
Sri Lanka
Syria
United Arab Emirates (UAE)

Europe

Albania
Armenia
Austria
Belarus
Belgium
Bulgaria
Croatia
Cyprus
Denmark
Estonia
England
Finland
France
Georgia
Germany
Greece
Hungary
Iceland
Ireland
Israel
Italy
Lithuania
Luxembourg
Macedonia
Netherlands
Norway
Romania
Russia
Serbia
Slovenia
Spain
Sweden
Switzerland
Turkey
United Kingdom
Wales (Not affiliated with United Nations or WFUNA)

North America
United Nations Association in Canada
Asociación Cubana de las Naciones Unidas
Asociación Dominicana de las Naciones Unidas
Asociación Guatemalteca pro-Naciones Unidas
United Nations Association of Jamaica
Asociación Mexicana para las Naciones Unidas
Asociacion Nicaraguense de Naciones Unidas 
United Nations Association of Trinidad and Tobago
United Nations Association of the United States of America
Cuba

South America
Argentina
Bolivia
Brazil
Chile
Colombia
Ecuador
Peru
Suriname
Venezuela
Guyana
Trinidad and Tobago
Uruguay
Paraguay
Falkland Islands

Oceania
Australia
New Zealand
Melanesia countries
Micronesia countries
Polynesia countries

References

Map of the Current United Nations Associations

World Federation of United Nations Associations
United Nations